Marquardt Farm is a historic home and farm complex located at Wurtemberg in Dutchess County, New York.  The main house was built about 1810 and is a traditional two story, five bay, center hall Federal style dwelling.  The rectangular frame structure sits on a partially exposed stone foundation and topped by a gable roof. It has a one-story frame wing.  Also on the property are three barns, a carriage house, stone walls, a machine shed, well / wellhouse, and summer kitchen.  The barn group includes a large "H" frame Dutch barn and two smaller barns.

It was added to the National Register of Historic Places in 1987.

References

Houses on the National Register of Historic Places in New York (state)
Federal architecture in New York (state)
Houses in Dutchess County, New York
National Register of Historic Places in Dutchess County, New York